The Boys Light Up is the debut album from Australian pub rock band Australian Crawl, which was released in 1980 and contains the title track, "The Boys Light Up", "Indisposed", "Downhearted" and their previously released debut single "Beautiful People". The album reached #4 on the Australian album charts and remained in the charts for an unbroken 101 weeks, eventually selling over 280 000 copies (five times platinum).

Various band members were involved in songwriting, often with relatives or former bandmates. Rhythm guitarist Brad Robinson's father James Robinson was a Federal Arbitration Court Justice and co-wrote two songs for this album. Reyne's bandmate from Spiff Rouch, Mark Hudson co-wrote their first single, "Beautiful People" (1979). "Downhearted" was written by Bill McDonough and his bandmates from The Flatheads, Guy McDonough (his brother, who later joined the Crawl) and Sean Higgins. Producer, David Briggs (Little River Band guitarist), co-wrote "Hoochie Gucci Fiorucci Mama" with Reyne.

The album was re-released in 1992 in CD format (see cover right below), and as a 2-CD set with follow-up album Sirocco in 1996. In October 2010, Boys Light Up was listed in the top 50 in the book, 100 Best Australian Albums.

Track listing 
 "My Coffee's Gone Cold" (Simon Binks) – 3:29
 "Man Crazy" (James Reyne) – 3:39
 "Way I've Been" (Brad Robinson, James Robinson) – 2:17
 "Chinese Eyes" (James Reyne, Simon Binks) – 3:01
 "Downhearted" (Sean Higgins, Guy McDonough, William 'Bill' McDonough) – 3:09
 "Beautiful People" (James Reyne, Mark Hudson) – 2:56
 "Indisposed" (Brad Robinson, James Robinson, James Reyne, William 'Bill' McDonough) – 4:04
 "Walk My Way" (James Reyne, Brad Robinson) – 2:44
 "The Boys Light Up" (James Reyne) – 4:41
 "Boot Hill" (James Reyne, Simon Binks) – 2:36
 "Red Guitar" (Simon Binks) – 3:19
 "Hoochie Gucci Fiorucci Mama" (James Reyne, David Briggs) – 2:30

Songwriting credits from Australasian Performing Right Association (APRA).

Personnel 
Credited to:

Australian Crawl 
 James Reyne – lead vocals, harmonica
 Simon Binks – lead and slide guitar, vocals
 Bill McDonough – drums, percussion, vocals
 Brad Robinson – rhythm guitar, vocals
 Paul Williams – bass, vocals

Additional musicians 
 Mal Logan, Eddie Rayner, Peter Jones, Keith McKay – keyboards
 Bill Harrower – saxophone
 Derek Pellicci – percussion
 Mal Stainton – backing vocals

Additional credits 
 Engineer — Ross Cockle
 Producer — David Briggs

Charts

Weekly charts

Year-end charts

Certifications

References 

Australian Crawl albums
1980 debut albums